The Uel-Siktyakh (Yuyol-Siikteex) is a river in Sakha Republic (Yakutia), Russia. It is one of the northern tributaries of the Lena.

The river flows north of the Arctic Circle across desolate areas of Bulunsky District. The nearest inhabited place is Siktyakh, located near its mouth.
The name of the river comes from the Yakut "uel/siktyakh" (уэл/сиктях), meaning "wet/damp place".

Course
The Uel-Siktyakh is a right tributary of the Lena. It has its origin in the slopes of the Dzhardzhan Range, on the western flank of the Orulgan Range, northern Verkhoyansk Range system. The  Uel-Siktyakh is formed at the confluence of the Yras-Siktyakh and Daldyndya rivers. It flows first roughly northwestwards. After leaving the mountains it bends and heads northeastwards across a floodplain. Towards the end it meanders strongly in a swampy area of the Central Yakutian Lowland dotted with lakes.

See also
List of rivers of Russia

References

External links 
Fishing & Tourism in Yakutia

Rivers of the Sakha Republic
Verkhoyansk Range
Central Yakutian Lowland